Jianyi may refer to:

Jianyi, Liaoning (建一), a town in Dashiqiao, Liaoning, China

Historical eras
Jianyi (建義, 385–388), era name used by Qifu Guoren, ruler of Western Qin
Jianyi (建義, 528), era name used by Emperor Xiaozhuang of Northern Wei

See also
Jian Yi, Chinese filmmaker